Česlovas is a Lithuanian masculine given name and may refer to:
Česlovas Juršėnas (b. 1938), Lithuanian politician
Česlovas Kudaba (1934–1993), Lithuanian politician
Česlovas Kundrotas (b. 1961), Lithuanian long-distance runner and Olympic competitor
Česlovas Lukenskas (b. 1959), Lithuanian sculpture and performance artist
Česlovas Sasnauskas (1867–1916), Lithuanian composer
Česlovas Stankevičius (b. 1937), Lithuanian politician 

Lithuanian masculine given names